I Remember You is a 2015 American romantic drama film written and directed by Claudia Sparrow.  It stars Stefanie Butler and Joe Egender as two people who come to believe they are destined to fall in love.  It premiered at the Downtown Film Festival on July 22, 2015, and was released theatrically on November 13, 2015.

Plot 
After Leah, a scientist, saves the life of Samuel, an actor, their lives change dramatically.  Samuel comes to believe that they have always been destined to fall in love and eventually convinces Leah of his metaphysical ideas.

Cast 
 Stefanie Butler as Leah
 Joe Egender as Samuel
 Scott Cushman
 Malin Yhr
 Steve Wilcox

Production 
The budget was less than $500,000.  It is the first film to be produced by Local Hero.

Release 
I Remember You premiered at the Downtown Film Festival in Los Angeles, California, on July 22, 2015.  It was theatrically released on November 13, 2015.

Reception 
Michael Nordine of The Village Voice wrote that Sparrow "zigs where you expect her to zag (not always in the best of ways)", but the film's predictable ending is still satisfying.  Martin Tsai of the Los Angeles Times wrote that it is difficult to accept that Butler's character, a scientist, would accept the film's metaphysical themes.  Tsai states that the film almost fails the Bechdel test.

References

External links 
 
 

2015 films
2015 romantic drama films
American independent films
American romantic drama films
2015 independent films
2010s English-language films
2010s American films